Esteve "Tito" Rabat Bergada (born 25 May 1989) is a Spanish motorcycle racer. He is best known for winning the 2014 Moto2 World Championship.

Rabat then made the move to MotoGP in 2016 and spent five full-time seasons there, before moving to the Superbike World Championship in 2021. Rabat suffered serious leg injuries in August 2018 after falling in heavy rain during practice for the British round at Silverstone. He was hit by a closely following out-of-control machine.

He started racing professionally in 2005, and made his Grand Prix début at that season's Valencian Grand Prix.

Career

125cc World Championship

Team BQR (2005–2006)
Tito Rabat made his debut on the world championship stage as a wildcard rider in the final race of the 2005 season in Valencia with BQR. For 2006, Rabat entered as a wildcard as a home rider in the Spanish rounds 1 and 7 in Jerez and Barcelona respectively. Following Aleix Espargaró's mid-season move up to the 250cc class, Rabat replaced him from round 8 for the remainder of the season.

Repsol Honda (2007)
For 2007, Rabat was given a seat in the Repsol Honda 125cc works team, partnering Bradley Smith. He finished the season in 11th place, behind his teammate.

Repsol KTM (2008)
Following Honda's departure from the 125cc class in a works capacity, the Repsol team switched to KTM bikes. Rabat was retained as rider and partnered young rookie and future World Champion Marc Márquez. Despite starting 3 more races than his teammate, Rabat finished behind Márquez in the standings by 14 points.

Team BQR (2009–2010)

In 2009 and 2010, Rabat returned to BQR, now racing under the Blusens name and using Aprilia motorcycles.

Moto2 World Championship

Team BQR (2011)
Rabat moved up to the Moto2 class in 2011 with BQR, riding FTR machinery, finishing a respectable 10th place on the season as a rookie.

Pons Racing (2012–2013)

2012
For 2012, Rabat switched to Pons Racing and achieved 7th place in the championship.

2013
Rabat's breakthrough year came during the  season. After finishing ninth in the season-opening Qatar Grand Prix, Rabat recorded a second-place finish at the Grand Prix of the Americas; after five previous third places, it was Rabat's best result in Grand Prix racing at the time. The following race, Rabat achieved his first pole position in the Spanish Grand Prix, outpacing all of his rivals by over four tenths of a second. In the race, Rabat led from start to finish, winning by over four seconds from Scott Redding. He added victories later in the season, at the Indianapolis and Malaysian Grands Prix.

Marc VDS Racing Team (2014–2015)

2014
For the 2014 Moto2 season, Rabat moved to the Marc VDS team and won the season opening race at Qatar ahead of his new teammate Mika Kallio. Over the course of the season he would take a further 6 wins and 7 podiums, only missing the podium in 4 races, for a total of 346 points. After finishing third at the Malaysian Grand Prix, he was crowned World Champion, the first for the Marc VDS team, ahead of Kallio.

2015
Remaining in Moto2 for 2015, Rabat attempted to become the first rider since Jorge Lorenzo to retain the intermediate class championship. Rabat did not win a race until Mugello at the end of May. Wins in Aragon and Valencia were not enough for Rabat to retain his title, as he ultimately finished third behind Johann Zarco and Álex Rins.

MotoGP World Championship

EG 0,0 Marc VDS (2016–2017)

2016
Rabat moved up to the MotoGP class on a satellite Honda bike for Marc VDS. He recorded his first top-ten finish in Argentina with ninth place, but could not match teammate Jack Miller's performance.

2017
He remained with Marc VDS for 2017, managing only one top-ten finish in the final race of the season. He finished the season with 35 points in 19th position of the rider's championship.

Esponsorama Racing (2018–2020)

2018
For 2018, Rabat returned again to his previous 125cc and Moto2 team Reale Avintia Racing, partnering Xavier Siméon. At the British Grand Prix Rabat's major crash, being hit by the crashed bike of the closely-following Franco Morbidelli at Stowe corner, was a contributing factor in the decision to cancel the race due to unsafe conditions. As a result of the triple fracture he sustained to his right leg, Rabat missed the remaining 7 races of the 2018 season. He finished the season with an identical result to the previous season – 35 points and 19th place in the riders' championship.

2019
Rabat returned in 2019 with Avintia, ultimately outscoring new teammate Karel Abraham and finishing 20th in the riders' championship. During the season, it was announced Rabat had signed with the team for a further two seasons, through the end of 2021.

2020
With the rebranded Esponsorama Racing for 2020, Rabat time partnered Johann Zarco. He had a difficult year, only managing four points finishes and suffering four retirements in the COVID-19 shortened season. He finished the season with 10 points in 22nd place of the rider's championship. At the end of the season, it was announced that Esponsorama had elected to buy out Rabat's contract early.

Pramac Racing (2021)
In 2021, Rabat returned to the MotoGP grid as a replacement rider for the injured Jorge Martín.

MotoE World Cup

Prettl Pramac MotoE (2023)
In 2023, Tito Rabat joins Pramac Racing in MotoE.

Superbike World Championship

Barni Racing Team (2021) 
In March 2021, it was announced that Rabat would ride a Ducati Panigale V4 R with the Barni Racing Team in World Superbike. He parted from Barni before the season end, with the team "citing results".

ESBK Spanish Superbike Speed Championship

Honda Laglisse (2022) 
In March 2022, it was announced that Rabat would take part in the ESBK Spanish Superbike Speed Championship riding for Honda Laglisse. In August 2022, Rabat competed at the Thruxton Circuit race weekend in the British Superbike Championship, filling in for a rider vacancy.

British Superbike Championship

TAG Racing Honda (2022) 
In August  2022, Rabat competed with TAG Racing, a satellite Honda team, in the British Superbike Championship, replacing Luke Mossey at Thruxton on 13/14 August. Rabat finished his three races in 26th place (last), 28th (last), and finally a DNF. In late August 2022, Rabat attended Cadwell Park for the BSB round, but only rode in the free practice sessions, again in last position, before arrangements with the TAG squad were severed.

Career statistics

Grand Prix motorcycle racing

By season

By class

Races by year
(key) (Races in bold indicate pole position; races in italics indicate fastest lap)

Superbike World Championship

By season

Races by year
(key) (Races in bold indicate pole position, races in italics indicate fastest lap)

* Season still in progress.

British Superbike Championship

By season

By year

ESBK Campeonato de España de Superbikes

By year

References

External links

 

1989 births
Living people
Motorcycle racers from Catalonia
Spanish motorcycle racers
125cc World Championship riders
Moto2 World Championship riders
Marc VDS Racing Team MotoGP riders
Avintia Racing MotoGP riders
MotoGP World Championship riders
Esponsorama Racing MotoGP riders
Pramac Racing MotoGP riders
Superbike World Championship riders
Moto2 World Riders' Champions